Bilwamangal (pronounced ), also known as Bhagat Soordas, is a 1919 Indian black-and-white silent film directed by Rustomji Dhotiwala, based on a story by Champshi Udeshi about the medieval Hindu devotional poet Bilwamangala (also identified with Surdas). This full length (12000 feet) film was produced by  the Elphinstone Bioscope Company, Calcutta with Bengali intertitles and is credited as the first Bengali feature film. It was released on 1 November 1919 at Cornwallis Theatre in Calcutta. The National Film Archive of India acquired the footage of film from Cinémathèque Française, France in 2016. The acquired footage is 594 metres long or run 28 minutes at 18 fps.

Plot
It featured the story of Bilwamangal (or Surdas), a man whose life ruined due to his relationship with courtesan Chintamani.

Cast

 Miss Gohur as Temptress Chintamani
 Dorabji Mewawala as Bilwamangal/Surdas

References

External links

1919 films
Indian silent films
1910s Bengali-language films
Indian black-and-white films
1910s romance films
Indian romance films
Films about courtesans in India
Hindu devotional films
Hindu mythological films
Indian biographical drama films
Silent drama films